Mariana Duque was the defending champion, but chose to participate in Beijing instead.

Lourdes Domínguez Lino won the title, defeating Alizé Lim in the final, 7–5, 6–4.

Seeds

Main draw

Finals

Top half

Bottom half

References 
 Main draw

Abierto Tampico - Singles